The Phu Quoc Ridgeback (Vietnamese: Chó Phú Quốc) is a rare breed of dog from the island of Phú Quốc in Kiên Giang Province in southern Vietnam. It is one of three ridgeback breeds, the others being the Rhodesian Ridgeback and the Thai Ridgeback. It is not recognized by the Fédération Cynologique Internationale or any other major club. The Phu Quoc Ridgeback is one of the four native Vietnamese dog breeds, along with the Bắc Hà dog (Chó Bắc Hà), Lài dog (chó lài), Hmong Bobtail Dog (chó H’Mông).

History
There is considerable debate as to exactly when and how the breed arrived to the island of Phú Quốc. The breed was originally a landrace developed as a semi-feral companion to hunt for food and guard the homes of native islanders. French colonists recognized the distinct dogs as a unique breed in the 19th century, and two resided at the Jardin d’Acclimitation in Paris. Historically, Phu Quoc Ridgebacks were not purposefully bred, instead relying on random pairings in the relative isolation of island life to continue to maintain their unique population.  According to native Phú Quốc islanders, there were originally three sizes of the breed, each uniquely bred to hunt different sizes of game over different terrains. Unfortunately, purebred examples became scarce after the introduction of non-native dogs to the island, with many French writers noting that the breed was near extinction by the turn of the 20th century.  

Despite the near extinction, genetic studies indicate that the Phu Quoc Ridgeback population is genetically diverse. It was commonly thought that the Phu Quoc Ridgeback derives from the Thai Ridgeback, but recent research suggests otherwise.  According to a genetic analysis, the Phu Quoc Ridgeback is most closely related to Korea's Pungsan dog. The breed population has been resurging as public interest grows. A Phu Quoc Ridgeback won the Hanoi dog show in 2013. The breed was selected as the mascot for the 2018 annual Nguyen Hue Flower Street in Ho Chi Minh City, symbolizing the lunar Year of the Dog as per the Vietnamese zodiac.

Description

Medium sized with a hound shape, but with a larger head and well-developed muscles, the Phu Quoc Ridgeback is genetically and morphologically different from the Thai Ridgeback. All or part of the Phu Quoc's tongue is blue in color and the feet are webbed.  Phu Quoc Ridgebacks are prized for their ability to run fast, swim well, and follow either a hot or a cold trail. As hunting dogs, they are known for their versatility, working both individually and in packs to take down a variety of prey including mice, fish, deer, and water buffalo. They also make excellent camp dogs, alerting to intruders.

Dorsal ridge 
The dorsal ridge on Phu Quoc Ridgebacks is described by shape, of which there are 5 main shapes: music note, sword, saddle, half-saddle, and arrow-shaped. The ridgeback phenomenon develops when the neural tube forms in embryogenesis, leading to the characteristic hair follicle orientation.

References 

Dog breeds originating in Asia
Animal breeds originating in Vietnam
Ridgeback dogs
Hounds